KDOR-TV (channel 17) is a religious television station licensed to Bartlesville, Oklahoma, United States, serving the Tulsa area as an owned-and-operated station of the Trinity Broadcasting Network (TBN). The station's transmitter is located in rural northwestern Rogers County (southwest of Talala). As of 2018, KDOR-TV's studio facilities on North Yellowwood Avenue (east of the Mingo Valley Expressway) in Broken Arrow are closed. Broadcasts continue as all program content is generated at TBN's International Production Center in Irving, Texas.

History

The station first signed on the air in January 1987.

Subchannels

References

External links 
KDOR-TV FCC Public File
TBN official website

Trinity Broadcasting Network affiliates
Television channels and stations established in 1987
1987 establishments in Oklahoma
DOR-TV
Bartlesville, Oklahoma